WPDS-LD, virtual and UHF digital channel 14, is a low-powered educational independent television station licensed to Largo, Florida, United States. The station is owned by Pinellas County Schools of Pinellas County, Florida.

WPDS can also be seen in Pinellas County on cable channel 14 on WOW! systems, and digital channel 614 on Spectrum.

While the station is owned by Pinellas County Schools, the station's call letters are named after "Pinellas District Schools", which is the name used on public school buses in Pinellas County. All public school buses in Florida are named similarly.

The station's studios and transmitters are located at the School Board headquarters in downtown Largo.

History

The station had its start in the early 1980s as a cable-only channel. In 1990, it opened a low-powered UHF channel on channel 14, to reach viewers without cable service. Initially W14AW, it changed its call letters to WPDS-LP in 1996. The station transitioned to digital in late 2009 as WPDS-LD, using the same transmitter location and wattage.

The WPDS call letters were originally used in the Tampa Bay area in the early-1980s by easy-listening radio station WPDS-FM ("Paradise 93", now WFLZ-FM). It was later used in Indianapolis from 1984 to 1985 as the first call letters of present-day Fox affiliate, WXIN.

Digital television

Digital channels
The station's digital channel is multiplexed:

References

External links
 

Educational and instructional television channels
PDS-LD
Television channels and stations established in 1988
Low-power television stations in the United States
Pinellas County, Florida
1980s establishments in Florida